Logan is a city in Phillips County, Kansas, United States.  As of the 2020 census, the population of the city was 460.

History
Logan was founded in 1870. It was named for Gen. John A. Logan. The first post office in Logan was established in March 1872.

Logan experienced growth when, circa 1880, the railroad was built through the town.

Geography
Logan is located at  (39.662269, -99.571160).

Demographics

2010 census
As of the census of 2010, there were 589 people, 261 households, and 169 families residing in the city. The racial makeup of the city was 99.3% White, 0.5% from other races, and 0.2% from two or more races. Hispanic or Latino of any race were 1.5% of the population.

There were 261 households, of which 24.9% had children under the age of 18 living with them, 53.3% were married couples living together, 6.9% had a female householder with no husband present, 4.6% had a male householder with no wife present, and 35.2% were non-families. 33.7% of all households were made up of individuals, and 18.4% had someone living alone who was 65 years of age or older. The average household size was 2.26 and the average family size was 2.85.

The median age in the city was 45.2 years. 27% of residents were under the age of 18; 2.6% were between the ages of 18 and 24; 20.3% were from 25 to 44; 26.9% were from 45 to 64; and 23.3% were 65 years of age or older. The gender makeup of the city was 45.7% male and 54.3% female.

2000 census
As of the census of 2000, there were 603 people, 249 households, and 167 families residing in the city. The racial makeup of the city was 99.34% White, 0.17% African American, and 0.50% from two or more races.

There were 249 households, out of which 26.1% had children under the age of 18 living with them, 56.2% were married couples living together, 7.6% had a female householder with no husband present, and 32.9% were non-families. 30.5% of all households were made up of individuals, and 16.1% had someone living alone who was 65 years of age or older. The average household size was 2.22 and the average family size was 2.78.

In the city, the population was spread out, with 21.7% under the age of 18, 4.6% from 18 to 24, 20.6% from 25 to 44, 25.4% from 45 to 64, and 27.7% who were 65 years of age or older. The median age was 47 years. For every 100 females, there were 78.4 males. For every 100 females age 18 and over, there were 76.1 males.

The median income for a household in the city was $29,417, and the median income for a family was $35,769. Males had a median income of $28,393 versus $20,000 for females. The per capita income for the city was $14,336. About 8.3% of families and 12.4% of the population were below the poverty line, including 17.3% of those under age 18 and 9.9% of those age 65 or over.

Education
Logan is home to USD 326 Logan.

The Logan Trojans won the Kansas State High School boys class 1A basketball championship in 1970.

References

Further reading

External links
 City of Logan
 Logan - Directory of Public Officials
 USD 326, local school district
 Logan city map, KDOT

Cities in Kansas
Cities in Phillips County, Kansas
1870 establishments in Kansas
Populated places established in 1870